Deuntae Graham (born July 1, 2000), known professionally as Prince Taee, is an American rapper, singer, and songwriter from Las Vegas, Nevada.

Early life 
Born on July 1, 2000, Prince Taee is the eldest of six siblings. Taee was born in Inglewood, California his family then moved to Victorville, California and later settling in Las Vegas, Nevada in 2016.

Career

Career and rise to popularity 
In 2016, Prince Taee would start taking music seriously after gaining much popularity from his first record "Party". In 2019 Prince Taee landed his first deal with the independent label TML (Too Much Loyalty) based out of Los Angeles. In 2020 Prince Taee signed with Art@War and major record label Atlantic records. May 2020 Prince Taee releases "Free Crack" which featured My Crazy Ro and YBN Almighty Jay. After this record Taee followed up with another record entitled "Just My Type" featuring YK Osiris. April 9, 2021 Prince Taee releases "Braces" featuring YBN Nahmir.

Personal life 
Throughout his childhood Taee had music inspiration around him from his mother and step father. Prince Taee's biological father was not present but he took inspiration from his step father which was the grandson of the late Solomon Burke. In 2019 Prince Taee was shot in the leg in Los Angeles, California in a drive-by shooting.

Discography

Singles

References

2000 births
Living people
African-American male rappers
American male rappers
21st-century African-American people
20th-century African-American people